Philotes is a genus of butterflies in the family Lycaenidae. Philotes is a monotypic genus containing only Philotes sonorensis, the Sonoran blue or stonecrop blue, found in North America in California and Baja California. The habitat consists of rocky washes, outcrops and cliffs in deserts.

The wingspan is 22–25 mm. The upperside is silvery blue with red spots at the outer margin of the forewings. Females also have red spots on the hindwings. Adults are on the wing in February and March, with just one generation per year.

The larvae feed on Dudleya species, including D. cymosa, D. lanceolata and D. saxosa. They bore into the leaves of their host plant. Chrysalids hibernate under stones.

Taxonomy 
Molecular phylogeny reconstructed a tree of the genus Pseudophilotes and identified a clade of Philotes sonorensis and Scolitantides orion as the closest relatives.

Subspecies
Philotes sonorensis sonorensis
†Philotes sonorensis extincta Mattoni, 1989 (upper San Gabriel river wash in southern California). This population in the San Gabriel Mountains was sampled annually for three decades leading to its disappearance in 1970. It was recognized nearly two decades later as a sub-species.

References

External links
 
 

Polyommatini
Butterflies described in 1865
Taxa named by Baron Cajetan von Felder
Taxa named by Rudolf Felder
Butterflies of North America